A language laboratory is a dedicated space for foreign language learning where students access audio or audio-visual materials. They allow a teacher to listen to and manage student audio, which is delivered to individual students through headsets or in isolated sound booths. Language labs were common in schools and universities in the United States in the two decades following World War II. They have now largely been replaced by self access language learning centers, which may be called language labs.

History

It was popular to learn foreign languages in the 20th century in the United States. During World War Two, there was a club for soldiers to learn foreign languages in order to communicate with others. This institute was called Army Specialized Training Program (ASTP), and that could be considered as the time language lab existed in the real world (Plate, 2015). However, during that time, this can only be called the army education system and it changed several times to meet the requirements of people. Also, the teaching ways were changed as well. Until now, language learning was combined with technology and people have more opportunities and chances to learn languages. 

The first recorded language lab was established at the University of Grenoble in 1908. Frank Chalfant brought the concept to the United States, establishing a 'phonetics lab' at Washington State University in 1911 or 1912. These early language labs used phonographs to deliver audio, and were not yet divided into individual booths.

In the 1940s, linguists at the University of Michigan developed the behaviorist audio-lingual method of foreign language learning. This method relied on repeated listening and speaking drills. This method increased in popularity in the United States and Canada into the 1950s and 1960s. Language labs were well-suited to the audio-lingual method. By 1958, there were over 300 language labs in the US, with the majority in colleges and universities. 

In 1958, the National Defense Education Act authorized federal financial assistance for American secondary school foreign language programs. This led to the rapid creation of new language labs. By the mid-1960s, there were an estimated 10,000 secondary-level and 4,000 post-secondary language labs in the United States. Once NDEA funding ended in 1969, the number of traditional language laboratories declined rapidly. Usage of the audio-lingual method also declined following Noam Chomsky's criticism of behaviorist models of language learning.

From the 1950s to the 1990s, most used tape-based systems. Current language labs generally contain multimedia PCs.

Language Lab in India

In early 2000, three budding entrepreneurs were thrown a challenge by the principal of a prominent women's college at Kochi –- automate her analogue language laboratory as she had become quite sick of its upkeep and maintenance. Thus in 2005, with the help of a hastily put-together a team of six software developers they created history by launching the first digital language lab –- the very first indigenous one in the country –- at the same college. Orell is the first software company in India to develop and implement Digital Language Lab .

Layout
The 'traditional' language laboratory consisted of a teacher console networked to multiple stations for individual students. The teacher console typically included a tape recorder to play the instructional recording, a headset and system of switches to enable the teacher to monitor either the audio being played or an individual student, and a microphone for communicating with students. Each student station generally included a student tape recorder, headset, and microphone. The tape recorder both enabled recording of students' spoken responses and allowed them to record instructional content for later independent study.

Types
Generally divided into two types: a. Listening type (Audio-passiveLL, referred to as A-P type). Students use earphones to listen to recorded teaching materials. It is a language laboratory with only one-way voice transmission function, also known as listening room. b. Listening and speaking type (Audio-Active LL, referred to as A-A type). Teachers and students have earphones and microphones, so it is a language laboratory that can carry out question-and-answer dialogues, has two-way voice transmission function, and generally has soundproof seats.
② Hearing and contrasting
(Audio-Active Comparative LL, referred to as A-A-C type). In addition to the teacher-student dialogue, students can record the recorded teaching materials broadcast by the teacher and their own oral exercises for comparison. In some listening and speaking contrast-type language laboratories, teachers can also remotely control students' tape recorders or monitor and monitor students' homework.
③Audio-visual type
(Audio Visual LL, referred to as A-V type). Visual images such as slideshows, movies, and videos can be played at the same time to create real and vivid language situations. Audiovisual language laboratories are also suitable for teaching a variety of subjects.
In addition, some language laboratories, in addition to audio-visual functions, are also equipped with long-term microprocessors, which can analyze and evaluate students' homework at any time.

This is why a language lab is crucial to learning to communicate effectively in any foreign language, regardless of the script. However, A best Advanced Digital language Lab is not just another "special equipment" that requires a room. It is a smart, digitally-driven and cloud-based language lab software program, especially effective in supporting mobile assisted language-learning and teaching to attain fluency in any foreign language of your choice. It provides instant and seamless access to native-speakers via audio-video aids, helping you imbibe the nuances of the language almost as if you were residing in a foreign country where you did not have a choice but to speak the native language. Programed to run across operating systems and even available as an app, is truly the next-generation language mastering tool.

Example ORELL DIGITAL LANGUAGE LAB

Operation

Once the master program had been transferred onto the student recorders, the teacher would then hand over control of the decks to the students. By pressing the record key in the booth, the student would simultaneously hear the playback of the program whilst being able to record his or her voice in the pauses, using the microphone. This is known as an audio active-comparative system. From a technological point of view, this overdubbing was made possible by use of a two-channel tape recorder

Problems

Language laboratories in the 1970s and 1980s received a bad reputation due to breakdowns. Common problems stem from the limitations and relative complexity of the reel to reel tape system in use at that time(Sihite, 2017). Design played a part too; the simplest language laboratories had no electronic systems in place for the teacher to remotely control the tape decks, relying on the students to operate the decks correctly. Many had no way to stop the tape running off the reel in fast rewind or forward wind, which meant time wasting and greater chances of failure through misuse.

The tape recorders in use after the early 1970s in the language laboratory were more complex than those in the home, being capable of multitracking and electronic remote control(sihite, 2017). As a result, they often had several motors and relays, complex transistorised circuitry and needed a variety of voltages to run. They had many rubber parts such as idlers and drive belts which would perish and wear out. Bulbs in the control panels were also in continual need of replacement. Since the student booth tapes were not normally changed from one class to the next but were recorded over each time, these would eventually wear, and shed their oxide on the tape heads leading to poor sound and tangling.

The installations were usually maintained under contract by service engineers, but these often served a county or similar wide area, and would only call at three-monthly intervals{sihite, 2017}. This meant that if several booths malfunctioned, then for much of that time the laboratory was out of action.

Sihite, J. (2017). The Role Of Language Lab Technique In Learning English As A Second Language.
Baker, M., Buyya, R., & Laforenza, D. (2002). Grids and Grid technologies for wide‐area distributed computing. Software: Practice and Experience, 32(15), 1437-1466.

Change of media

Starting in the 1980s, many schools transformed their old language labs into computer suites. However, the advent of affordable multimedia capable PCs in the late 1990s led to a resurgence and transformation of the language laboratory with software and hard drives in place of reels of analogue tape(Cuban, 1993).

In the 1990s new digital, hybrid PC based systems allowed extended functionality, in terms of better "management' of student / teacher audio with some levels of internet and video formats.

Media is 'managed' on these hybrid systems by language lab providers creating a supplementary network over and above the existing PC network for audio connections and communications in fixed locations. These hybrid systems are not without problems, mainly associated with hardware issues  as the manufacturers of these hybrid systems have to replace parts and separate cabling. This both adds to the complexity of the product and has a cost implication via manufacturer annual ‘service’ fees.

Cuban, L. (1993). Computers meet classroom: Classroom wins. Teachers college record, 95(2), 185-210.

Present day

Today all the major manufacturers say they have a ‘digital’ or a ‘just software’ solution. However, in many cases they still rely on proprietary networks or expensive sound cards to successfully deliver their media. There are few software only solutions that just rely on installing designated language lab software onto a network and then directing just the original network to manage the media between teacher and student, student and student or student back to teacher. In the past the quality of school, or university networks may have meant that the speed that the media could be delivered on ‘software only’ labs would have meant a ‘lag’ in the audio feed. These days all professionally run networks are able to work with these ‘software only’ language lab solutions and deliver media synchronously.

Software only systems can be easily installed onto an existing PC-based network, making them both multi locational in their access and much more feature rich in how and what media they manage.

The content that is now used in the new language labs is much richer and self authored or free: now not just audio, but video, flash-based games, internet etc. and the speed and variety of the delivery of media from teacher to student, student to teacher, is much quicker.

Further developments in language labs are now apparent as access moves from a fixed network and related Microsoft operating systems to online and browsers. Students can now access and work from these new 'cloud' labs from their own devices at any time and anywhere. Students can interrogate and record audio and video files and be marked and assessed by their teachers remotely.

Digital language labs

The principle of a language lab essentially has not changed. They are still a teacher-controlled system connected to a number of student booths, containing a student's control mechanism and a headset with a microphone. Digital language labs had the same principle. A software-only language lab changes the concept of where and what a language lab is. Software can be installed and accessed on any networked PC anywhere on a school, college, or university campus. Software-only systems can be located in one room, from room-to-room or campus-to-campus.The latest form of the Digital Language was brought t India by ORELL group

Functionality

The levels of functionality of current language labs vary from manufacturer to manufacturer. All labs will have a level of teacher control to manage student licenses / desktops. The more sophisticated ‘software only’ labs have a higher level of teacher management and control over the student desktop. One of the key differences with the ‘high end’ ‘software only’ products is their ability to work ‘live’ with the students as they record and work with media. So instead of waiting to correct student recordings after they have been recorded and collected back it is now possible for a teacher to work synchronously and ‘live’ with students on their own, in pairs and in groups, thus enhancing the immediacy of the teaching and learning experience.

The next generation digital language labs allow teachers to monitor, control, deliver, group, display, review and collect, audio, video and web-based multimedia content. The student player is linked to the teacher console and can play audio, video and web-based formats. Students can rewind, stop, start, go back to last silence, record, fast forward, repeat phrase and bookmark.

References

Bibliography
 Cuban, L. (1993). Computers meet classroom: Classroom wins. Teachers college record, 95(2), 185-210.
 Plate, B. (2015). Language Labs: A Brief History.
 Warschauer, M. (2004). Technology and social inclusion: Rethinking the digital divide. MIT press.
 Sihite, J. (2017). The Role Of Language Lab Technique In Learning English As A Second Language. Baker, M., Buyya, R., & Laforenza, D. (2002). Grids and Grid technologies for wide‐area distributed computing. Software: Practice and Experience, 32(15), 1437-1466.

External links

 Norma Garcia and Laurence Wolff: The Lowly Language Lab: Going Digital TechKnowLogia, November/December 2001
 History of the Language Lab in the United States 
 10 Tips for choosing the Right Language Lab or Communication Skills Laboratory 
 benefits of  latest Digital Language Lab https://orell.com/Language-Lab/language-lab-advantages
Language education